The 1973 NAIA Division I football season was the 18th season of college football sponsored by the NAIA and the fourth season of the league's two-division structure.

The season was played from August to November 1973 and culminated in the 1973 NAIA Champion Bowl, played on December 8, 1973 at Independence Stadium in Shreveport, Louisiana.

Abilene Christian defeated Elon in the Champion Bowl, 42–14, to win their first NAIA national title.

Conference realignment

Conference changes
 This was the final season for the Oklahoma Collegiate Conference. After sixty-five season of football dating back to 1929, the OCC disbanded after the end of play, with six of its members subsequently departing to form the Oklahoma Intercollegiate Conference for the 1974 season.

Conference standings

Postseason

See also
 1973 NAIA Division II football season
 1973 NCAA Division I football season
 1973 NCAA Division II football season
 1973 NCAA Division III football season

References

 
NAIA Football National Championship